L'Étoile de Morne-à-l'Eau is a football club of Guadeloupe, based in the city of Morne-à-l'Eau.  They play in the Guadeloupe's first division, the Guadeloupe Championnat National.

Achievements
Guadeloupe Championnat National: 9
 1979–80, 1980–81, 1981–82, 1995–96, 1996–97, 1997–98, 2000–01, 2001–02, 2006–07

Coupe de Guadeloupe: 5
 1977, 1979, 1984, 1985, 2002, 2015, 2018

Coupe D.O.M.: 1
 1992

Performance in CONCACAF competitions
CFU Club Championship: 2 appearances
1997 – First Round – Group 1 – 3rd place – 2 pts (stage 1 of 2)
1998 – First Round – Lost against  Waterhouse F.C. 3–0 (stage 1 of 3)

CONCACAF Champions Cup: 5 appearances
1987 – Won to rounds at least
1989 – Play-off (Caribbean Zone) – Lost against  RC Rivière-Pilote 2–0  (stage 3 of 5)
1989 – Third Round (Caribbean Zone) – Lost against  Olympique du Marin 8–0  (stage 3 of 7)
1992 – Third Round (Caribbean) – Lost against  S.V. Robinhood 4–3 (stage 4 of 6)
1993 – Second Round (Caribbean) – Lost against  Aiglon du Lamentin 3–0 (stage 2 of 5)

The club in the French football structure
French Cup: 12 appearances
1977–78, 1982–83, 1984–85, 1988–89, 1992–93, 1994–95, 1996–97, 2000–01, 2003–04, 2012–13, 2015–16, 2017–18
{| class="wikitable" style="text-align: center"
|+ Ties won
! Year !! Round !! Home team (tier) !! Score !! Away team (tier)
|-
| 2000–01 || Round 7 || AS Muret (4) || 0–2 || Etoile
|-
| 2003–04 || Round 7 || Etoile || 2–2   || US Romorantin (3)
|}

External links
 Official Site

Etoile
1958 establishments in Guadeloupe